Vineyard Township is an inactive township in Lawrence County, in the U.S. state of Missouri.

Vineyard Township took its name from the extinct community of Vineyard, which had the name of the local Vineyard family.

References

Townships in Missouri
Townships in Lawrence County, Missouri